Kafingbe  is a village in western Benin. It is located in Bantè commune in the Collines Department.

Nearby towns and villages include Amou (7.2 nm), Okpedie (5.1 nm), Aloba (1.4 nm), Gbede (2.2 nm), Sako (3.0 nm), Abidzi (2.0 nm) and Konfouda (2.0 nm).

References

External links
Satellite map at Maplandia.com

Populated places in Benin